The Institute for Language and Folklore (acronym Isof), is a Swedish government agency with the purpose of studying and collecting materials concerning dialects, folklore and onomastics.

In June 2006 the Swedish government decided to centralize the Swedish language preservation institutes, starting on the July 1, 2006. The former name, Swedish Institute for Dialectology, Onomastics and Folklore Research was changed to the current name.

The institute consists of several, originally independent, units, located in different Swedish university towns. The central unit of the institute is located in Uppsala, with other departments located to Lund, Gothenburg, Umeå and Stockholm.

The institute is, among other things, responsible for the ongoing publication of Sveriges ortnamn (a dictionary of all Swedish placenames) and Sveriges medeltida personnamn (a dictionary of medieval Swedish personal names).

Units of the Institute
 Administrative Unit (Uppsala)
 Department of Dialectology, Uppsala (Dialektavdelningen, DA)
 Folklore Department, Uppsala (Folkminnesavdelningen, FA) 
 Phonogram Unit, Uppsala (Fonogramenheten)
 Department of Onomastics, Uppsala (Namnavdelning, NA). 
 Archive for Dialects, Placenames and Folklore in Gothenburg (Dialekt-, ortnamns- och folkminnesarkivet i Göteborg, DAG)
 Archive for Dialects and Placenames in Lund (Dialekt- och ortnamnsarkivet i Lund, DAL)
 Swedish Language Council (Språkrådet)
 Archive for Dialects, Placenames and Folklore in Umeå (Dialekt-, ortnamns- och folkminnesarkivet i Umeå, DAUM)

References

External links
 Isof, main website
 DAL
 DAG
 DAUM

Government agencies of Sweden
Swedish culture
Swedish folklore
Heritage organizations
Folklore studies
History organizations based in Sweden